"Aviation" is the third single by English band The Last Shadow Puppets from their second studio album, Everything You've Come to Expect. It was released on 16 March 2016 on Domino Records.

Music video 
The music video for "Aviation" features Turner and Kane digging holes on a beach as a man approaches in a car with a woman in bridal clothing. Kane turns and kisses the man, and a fight ensues before the woman runs down the beach and Turner and Kane are buried in the holes by the man's associates. The video serves as a prequel to the music video for "Everything You've Come to Expect".

The video was shot at Point Dume, Malibu. It was directed by Saam Farahmand and filmed in 16mm. Chung Chung-hoon served as DoP.

Personnel
The Last Shadow Puppets
Alex Turner – electric guitar, lead vocals
Miles Kane – lead vocals, acoustic guitar
James Ford – drums, percussion, keyboards
Zach Dawes – bass guitar

Additional personnel
Owen Pallett – strings arrangement

Charts

References

External links
 

2016 singles
2016 songs
The Last Shadow Puppets songs
Songs written by Alex Turner (musician)
Songs written by Miles Kane
Song recordings produced by James Ford (musician)
Domino Recording Company singles